Meyne Wyatt (born 14 August 1989) is an Australian actor. Wyatt graduated from the National Institute of Dramatic Art in 2010 and appeared in several theatre productions around the country. For his performance in Silent Disco, Wyatt was named Best Newcomer at the 2011 Sydney Theatre Awards. In 2012, he played a supporting role in the musical comedy film The Sapphires and also made his debut with the Bell Shakespeare company. The following year, Wyatt appeared in The Broken Shore and The Turning. His appearance in the second season of Redfern Now earned him nominations for Most Outstanding Newcomer at the 2014 Logie Awards and Best Lead Actor in a Television Drama at the 3rd AACTA Awards. From 2014 to 2016, Wyatt played the ongoing role of Nate Kinski in Neighbours.

Early life
Meyne Wyatt was born in Kalgoorlie on 14 August 1989, to Sue, a painter and children's book illustrator, and Brian, who worked for the National Native Title Council. His father was a Yamatji man, while his mother is from the Wongatha group. Wyatt is the youngest of four siblings and he attended Hale School in Perth from the age of 13. After leaving Hale, Wyatt completed a theatre course at the Western Australian Academy of Performing Arts (WAAPA). He auditioned for full-time places at WAAPA and the National Institute of Dramatic Art (NIDA), and was accepted into both. He decided to attend NIDA and graduated in 2010.

Career
Following his graduation from NIDA, Wyatt appeared in several theatre productions in Sydney, Adelaide and Brisbane. He won the Best Newcomer accolade at the 2011 Sydney Theatre Awards for his performance as an Aboriginal teenager in Lachlan Philpott's production of Silent Disco. In 2012, Wyatt was cast in the supporting role of Jimmy Middleton in the musical comedy film The Sapphires. Wyatt also made his debut with the Bell Shakespeare company, in a production of The School for Wives.

In early 2013, Wyatt starred in the lead role of Ralph Meyers's production of Peter Pan at the New Victory Theater. In that same year, Wyatt filmed a supporting role in The Broken Shore, a television miniseries based on Peter Temple's 2005 novel of the same name. He also appeared in the film adaptation of Tim Winton's short story collection The Turning. Wyatt played Frank Leaper, a footballer "who walks away at a key moment of his career", in the segment titled Family, which was directed by Shaun Gladwell.

Wyatt appeared in the second season of Redfern Now as a father whose newborn baby goes missing. He was initially cast in the first season of the drama, but had to drop out due to a scheduling conflict. For his performance in Redfern Now, Wyatt received nominations for Most Outstanding Newcomer at the 2014 Logie Awards and Best Lead Actor in a Television Drama at the 3rd AACTA Awards. Wyatt also joined the cast of feature film Strangerland, alongside Nicole Kidman and Joseph Fiennes.

On 20 July 2014, it was announced that Wyatt had joined the cast of long-running soap opera Neighbours as Nate Kinski. Wyatt is the first Indigenous actor to join the main cast since the show began in 1985. Executive producer Jason Herbison stated the decision to cast an Indigenous actor was "unintentional" and that Wyatt had been the best actor for the role. Wyatt relocated to Melbourne for filming and made his screen debut as Nate on 18 August 2014. Wyatt began appearing in the six-part sketch-comedy show Black Comedy in November 2014.

Wyatt took a break from Neighbours to appear in a Sydney Theatre Company production of King Lear, alongside Geoffrey Rush from November 2015 to January 2016. Wyatt's father died from throat cancer in October, causing him to miss the first two weeks of rehearsals. The director, Neil Armfield, briefly considered re-casting the role of Edmund, as he was concerned that Wyatt would find it hard to play a man who plots to murder his father. However, Wyatt found the play "a good distraction". Wyatt also appeared in the feature film What If It Works?. 

Wyatt left Neighbours in early 2016 and his character's last scenes aired in June that year. In 2017, Wyatt appeared in the American series The Leftovers, which was filmed in Australia. In 2018, he was a regular in the television drama series Mystery Road as Cedric Thompson.

Wyatt's first play, City of Gold, was published in July 2019 by Currency Press. A co-production between Queensland Theatre and Griffin Theatre premiered the play in Brisbane, before transferring to Sydney. It was shortlisted for the 2020 Victorian Premier's Prize for Drama, and Wyatt won the 2019 Best Male Actor in a Leading Role in a Mainstage Production accolade at the Sydney Theatre Awards for his role in it.

Wyatt starred in the 2021 ABC television comedy series Preppers.

Art 
In 2020, encouraged by his mother, he entered a self-portrait in the Archibald Prize and became the first Indigenous artist to win the Packing Room Prize.

Filmography

References

External links
 
 

Living people
1989 births
21st-century Australian male actors
Archibald Prize finalists
Australian male film actors
Australian male soap opera actors
Indigenous Australian male actors
Male actors from Western Australia
People from Kalgoorlie